Renaissance Academy may refer to one of several schools:
Crater Renaissance Academy a public high school in Central Point, Oregon.
East Los Angeles Renaissance Academy (ELARA), a public high school in East Los Angeles, California.
Highland Park Renaissance Academy, a public K-8 school in Highland Park, Michigan.
Renaissance Academy (Baltimore), a charter high school in Baltimore, Maryland.
Renaissance Academy Charter School, a charter K-12 school in Phoenixville, Pennsylvania.
Renaissance Academy, a Small Learning Community within John Marshall High School (Los Angeles), a public high school in Los Angeles, California. 
Renaissance Academy, an academic program within Albert Einstein High School, a public high school in Kensington, Maryland.
Renaissance Academy (of Arts, Science and Social Justice), a middle school (grade 6-8) in Alum Rock Union Elementary School District, San Jose, California.
Renaissance Academy, a special school within Davis School District, Kaysville, Utah.
Renaissance Public Academy, a charter school for grades 4–12 in Molalla River School District, Molalla River, Oregon.
Syracuse Renaissance Academy at Carnegie, an alternative school in Syracuse City School District, Syracuse, New York.